Gitlin is a surname. Notable people with the surname include:

Dan Gitlin (born 1983), American film editor
Drew Gitlin (born 1958), American tennis player
Michael Gitlin (born 1943), South African sculptor
Richard D. Gitlin (born 1943), American electrical engineer, inventor, executive and entrepreneur
Todd Gitlin (1943–2022), American sociologist, political writer, novelist and cultural commentator